Leron Mitchell (born November 24, 1981) is a former professional Canadian football defensive back. He most last played in the Canadian Football League for the Saskatchewan Roughriders.

Further reading 

1981 births
Living people
Black Canadian players of Canadian football
Canadian football defensive backs
Players of Canadian football from Ontario
Saskatchewan Roughriders players
Sportspeople from London, Ontario
Toronto Argonauts players
Western Mustangs football players